Ashutosh, born as Mahesh Kumar Jha and also known as Ashutosh Maharaj Ji (1946–2014), was an Indian spiritual leader, preacher, satguru, and founder head of Divya Jyoti Jagriti Sansthan (DJJS), a non-profit spiritual organisation. On 29 January 2014, he was declared clinically dead by a team of doctors. His followers believe him to be alive and in a state of samadhi or deep meditation. Since January 2014, his body has been kept in a freezer by the management of DJJS, with a firm belief that he will come out of meditation.

Early life
Ashutosh was born as Mahesh Kumar Jha in 1946 at Lakhnaur in Madhubani district, Bihar into a Hindu Brahmin family. There are claims that he married Anandi Devi and that the couple had a son, although this is disputed. He was believed to have visited many gurus in Himalayas and Varanasi.

Divya Jyoti Jagrati Sansthan 

Ashutosh founded Divya Jyoti Jagrati Sansthan as a non-profit spiritual organisation in Nurmahal, Punjab, India in 1983. It was registered as a socio-spiritual society/non-governmental organisation in 1991 under the Societies Registration Act with its head office in New Delhi. The organisation claims to have about 30 million followers. It has 350 branches spread across 15 countries and the value of its property has been estimated to be above 10 billion rupees (160 million USD). According to the organisation's website, their mission is "To usher into a world wherein every individual becomes an embodiment of truth, fraternity, and justice through the eternal science of self-realization – 'Brahm Gyan', uprooting in its wake all social evils and threat".

As the head of the organisation, Ashutosh is seen as a controversial figure among the Sikh community, who have alleged him to be hurting Sikh religious sentiments. He has been accused of distorting Sikh teachings, called Banis, and making negative comments about Sikhism and the Sikh gurus. Various Sikh bodies demanded a ban on his activities. There have been several violent clashes between his followers and some Sikh groups, including one in Ludhiana in December 2009 that resulted in a death. He was provided "Z+" security by the Indian government, which was later lowered to "Z" class.

Death
On 29 January 2014, Ashutosh suffered a heart attack and was declared clinically dead by a team of doctors. His followers believe him to be still alive and in a state of deep meditation called samadhi. , his body has been kept in a freezer by the management to create a "Himalayan-like environment" suitable for meditation.

Pooran Singh filed a habeas corpus writ, seeking the release of Ashutosh's body. After the writ was rejected, he petitioned the court for a post-mortem examination of the corpse. A person named as Dilip Kumar Jha, who claims to be the son of Ashutosh, also appealed to court, demanding that the body be brought to his home town in Bihar for cremation according to local rituals. The DJJS management have claimed that Ashutosh was single and had no family. On 1 December 2014 the Punjab and Haryana High Court ordered that the last rites for Ashutosh be performed in 15 days. The ruling was later suspended, with further hearings postponed to 9 February 2015. Almost three years later, in July 2017, the Punjab and Haryana High Court granted permission for the followers to preserve his body in a freezer, although it was unclear whether the court had agreed with the sect's argument that its founder was still alive.

References

Indian Hindu spiritual teachers
People from Bihar
People from Jalandhar district
20th-century Hindu religious leaders
21st-century Hindu religious leaders
1946 births

2014 deaths